The Alacón Formation is a geologic formation in Spain in which dinosaur tracks attributed to sauropods and Iguanodontidae have been found.

Correlation

References

Further reading 
  
 J. L. Barco, J. I. Canudo, J. I. Ruiz Omeñaca and R. Royo Torres. 1999. Bones, teeth and tracks: about sauropod dinosaur remains from Aragón (northeastern Spain). In J. I. Canudo & G. Cuenca-Bescós (eds.), IV European Workshop on Vertebrate Paleontology, Albarracin, Spain. Universidad de Zaragoza 22-23

Geologic formations of Spain
Lower Cretaceous Series of Europe
Cretaceous Spain
Barremian Stage
Ichnofossiliferous formations
Paleontology in Spain
Formations
Formations